Statistics of Swedish football Division 3 for the 1943–44 season.

League standings

Uppsvenska Sydöstra 1943–44

Uppsvenska Sydvästra 1943–44

Östsvenska Norra 1943–44

Östsvenska Södra 1943–44

Centralserien Norra, Uppland 1943–44

Centralserien Norra, Västmanland 1943–44

Centralserien Södra 1943–44

Nordvästra Norra 1943–44

Nordvästra Södra, Dalsland 1943–44

Nordvästra Södra, Bohus 1943–44

Mellansvenska Norra 1943–44

Mellansvenska Södra 1943–44

Sydöstra Norra 1943–44

Sydöstra Södra 1943–44

Västsvenska Norra 1943–44

Västsvenska Södra 1943–44

Sydsvenska Norra 1943–44

Sydsvenska Södra 1943–44

Footnotes

References 

Swedish Football Division 3 seasons
3
Swed